Giuseppe Spataro (12 June 1897 – 30 January 1979) was an Italian politician.

Biography 
Spataro was born in Vasto, Italy to Anna and Alfonso Nasci, who were a high-class Italian family, in the urban center within the province Chieti.

After studying in his birth city of Vasto, Spataro transferred to a boarding school called Montecassino in 1908, the adjustment to this new life made easier by the death of his father in 1910. In 1914, Spataro moved to Rome to study Law and graduated in 1919.
 
During the First World War, Spataro served as a "corpo specializzato del Genio, later to be promoted as an official.

Already distinguished within the main catholic-roman journalist firms, he became an exponent member of FUCI. In 1919, he was elected vice president, later advanced as president of FUCI in 1920. Following his presidency at FUCI, Spataro was elected vice-president at another organization called Pax Romana. Eventually, Spataro’s close relations with Luigi Sturzo- led to his membership to the Roman sector of the Italian People's Party in 1919. From 1921 to 1925, Spataro served as the sole national vice-secretary.

In 1923, Spataro married Letizia De Giorgio, and later had 3 children: Alfonso, Anna and PierGiorgio. Following his marriage, in June 1925, Spataro became the principal organizer of the international “V” congress of the party. Soon after, from 1945-1946, he became the vice secretary of internal affairs, in 1946, he was elected member of the National council and president of RAI. Through his control of this radio, and then television programming, Spataro was able to create the basis for his future Democratic-Christian control over the media. He held this post, until 1950, when he stepped down as president of RAI to assume position as minister of communications. In 1953, Spataro became minister of public works, and between 1953-1954, Spataro became vice secretary of Christian Democracy. In 1960, he became the minister of Merchant Navy and the minister of internal affairs as well as the minister of transport. In 1959, Spataro resumed his office as minister of telecommunications until 1962. Between 1964 until his death in 1979, Spataro served as president of the Istituto Luigi Sturzo, in Rome.

References 

1945 CARLO TRABUCCO, La prigionia di Roma: diario dei 268 giorni dell'occupazione tedesca, Roma, Edizioni SELI.
1979 GABRIELE DE ROSA, Giuseppe Spataro. Dal Partito popolare alla Democrazia cristiana, in "Sociologia", n.s., a. XXIII (1979), n. 2, pp. 39–52.
1980 MARIO D'ADDIO, Giuseppe Spataro e Luigi Sturzo nelle ultime vicende del Partito popolare, in "Sociologia", n.s., a. XXIV (1980), n. 1, pp. 5–14.
1980 RAFFAELE COLAPIETRA, Pescara 1860-1960, Pescara, Costantini.
1980 GABRIELLA FANELLO MARCUCCI, L’azione di Spataro negli ultimi mesi del Partito popolare, in "Civitas", a. XXXI (1980), n. 5, pp. 5–22.
1982 GABRIELLA FANELLO MARCUCCI, Alle origini delle Democrazia cristiana, 1929-1944: dal carteggio Spataro-De Gasperi, Brescia, Morcelliana.
1982 GABRIELLA FANELLO MARCUCCI, Giuseppe Spataro: lineamenti per una biografia, Roma, Cinque Lune.
1982 GIUSEPPE IGNESTI, Spataro, Giuseppe, voce in Dizionario storico del movimento cattolico in Italia 1860-1980, diretto da Francesco Traniello e Giorgio Campanini, Casale Monferrato, Marietti, vol. II: I protagonisti, pp. 603–608.
1984 GABRIELLA FANELLO MARCUCCI (a cura di), Storia di un’amicizia: Giovanni Battista Montini e Giuseppe Spataro, Brescia, Morcelliana.
1988 GIUSEPPE IGNESTI, Un erede del popolarismo nella seconda Democrazia cristiana: Giuseppe Spataro, in ID., Laici cristiani fra Chiesa e Stato nel Novecento. Profili e problemi, Roma, Editrice Universitaria - La Goliardica, pp. 236–252.
1989 Giuseppe Spataro. Rievocazione, con scritti di CIRIACO DE MITA, GUIDO GONELLA, GABRIELE DE ROSA, FRANCESCO MALGERI, Roma, Cinque Lune.
1989 LUIGI STURZO, Lettere a Giuseppe Spataro: 1922-1959, a cura di Gabriella Fanello Marcucci,  Roma, Istituto Luigi Sturzo - Gangemi, vol. IV.1 degli Scritti vari di Sturzo [con un Ricordo di Spataro, di Gabriele De Rosa, pp. 165–179].
1990 Giuseppe Spataro in cinquant’anni di storia italiana. Atti del convegno di Vasto, 8 dicembre 1989, nel decennale della morte [supplemento a "Oggi e Domani", a. XVIII, 1990, n. 11: contiene tra l'altro numerose lettere di Spataro a Sturzo e di De Gasperi a Spataro raccolte e commentate da Raffaele Colapietra].
1991 FRANCO BOIARDI, Giuseppe Spataro, in Il Parlamento italiano 1861-1988, vol. XVIII: 1959-*1963. Una difficile transizione verso il centro-sinistra, Milano, Nuova CEI, pp. 299–321.
1997 REMO GASPARI, Politica ed economia nel ‘modello’ Abruzzo, a cura di Costantino Felice, in "Abruzzo Contemporaneo", a. III (1997), n. 5, pp. 7–44.
1997 FRANCESCO MALGERI, La formazione della Dc tra scelte locali e urgenze nazionali, in Cattolici, Chiesa, Resistenza, a cura di Gabriele De Rosa, Bologna, il Mulino, pp. 533–563.
1997 SERGIO ZOPPI, Giuseppe Spataro: un ricordo, in "Abruzzo Contemporaneo", a. III (1997), n. 5, pp. 151–159.
2001 Con Spataro per un risveglio democratico: testimonianza di un’esperienza, L’Aquila, Gruppo consiliare Popolari Regione Abruzzo.
2001 COSTANTINO FELICE (a cura di), Il modello Abruzzese. Un caso virtuoso di sviluppo regionale, Corigliano Calabro, Meridiana Libri.
2001 MARIO GIUSEPPE ROSSI, Spataro, Giuseppe, voce in Dizionario della Resistenza, a cura di Enzo Collotti, Renato Sandri, Frediano Sessi, vol. II: Luoghi, formazioni, protagonisti, Torino, Einaudi, p. 646.
2002 REMO GASPARI, L'Abruzzo tra passato e futuro. Mezzo secolo di politica ed economia, a cura di Silvano Console, Pescara, Carsa.
2004 EDOARDO TIBONI, Giuseppe Spataro protagonista della ricostruzione (1897-1979), in ISTITUTO NAZIONALE DI STUDI CROCIANI, CENTRO NAZIONALE DI STUDI DANNUNZIANI, L'Abruzzo nel Novecento, a cura di Umberto Russo e Edoardo Tiboni, Pescara, Ediars, pp. 1231–1240.
2006 LICIO DI BIASE, Giuseppe Spataro. Una vita per la democrazia, Altino (Chieti), Ianieri.

1897 births
1979 deaths
People from Vasto
Italian military personnel of World War I
Transport ministers of Italy
Bonomi II Cabinet
Bonomi III Cabinet